Jayden John Lloyd Harris (born 4 September 1999) is an English footballer who plays as a midfielder for  club Carlisle United.

Career
Harris began his career with Fulham whom he joined at the age of ten, progressing through the ranks to regularly appearing for the Under-23s side before joining National League side Woking on a one-month loan deal in January 2020. At the end of the 2019–20 season, Harris extended his contract with the club for a further year having made 23 appearances for the Under-23s side, scoring three goals. Harris' departure was confirmed in June 2021.

On 24 June 2021, Harris signed for National League club Aldershot Town on a two-year contract. Having found first-team opportunities more limited following a managerial change, Harris joined National League South side Hampton & Richmond Borough on a one-month loan deal in October 2021.

On 3 August 2022, Harris signed for EFL League Two club Carlisle United for an undisclosed fee on a three-year contract. Harris scored his first goal for the club on 5 November with the winner in a 2–1 FA Cup First Round victory over Tranmere Rovers.

References

1999 births
Living people
English footballers
Association football midfielders
Fulham F.C. players
Woking F.C. players
Aldershot Town F.C. players
Hampton & Richmond Borough F.C. players
Carlisle United F.C. players
National League (English football) players
English Football League players